Eugen von Daday or Jenő von Daday (1855–1920) was a Romanian professor of zoology in Hungary in the late 19th and early 20th century. Daday was an expert on aquatic invertebrates, particularly crustaceans. Daday collected and identified many species and genera within the borders of the Hungarian empire, and received samples of invertebrates from collectors around the world. After his death in 1920, Daday's collection of crustaceans was acquired by the Hungarian Natural History Museum.

References

1855 births
1920 deaths
19th-century Hungarian zoologists
Romanian zoologists
Carcinologists
Hungarian people of Romanian descent
20th-century Hungarian zoologists